Creepshow 3 is a 2006 American comedy horror film, and a sequel to Stephen King and George A. Romero's horror anthology films Creepshow (1982) and Creepshow 2 (1987). It was directed and produced by Ana Clavell and James Dudelson. The film stars Kris Allen,  A. J. Bowen, Emmett McGuire and Stephanie Pettee. Like its predecessors, the film is a collection of tales of light-hearted horror: "Alice", "The Radio", "Call Girl", "The Professor's Wife", and "Haunted Dog", although there is no EC Comics angle this time around. The film was panned by critics.

Plot

Wraparound story
Unlike the first two Creepshow installments, in which the wraparound element linking the stories was a horror comic, Creepshow 3 takes an approach similar to Quentin Tarantino's Pulp Fiction in which characters from each story interact with each other during the film. There is also a hot dog stand as a common element in the movie. Brochures, ads, and other things from the hot dog stand are peppered throughout.

Alice
Alice Jacobs is a stuck-up, snotty teenager who comes home to find her father meddling with some kind of universal remote. Whenever he presses one of the buttons on the device, the whole family except for Alice changes ethnicity (i.e., the "Color and Hue Settings" button makes her family turn African-American, and the "Subtitles" button makes her family turn Hispanic). During this, Alice gradually mutates into what is supposedly her "true form".

Just when Alice thinks everything is back to normal, her father presses another button, revealing Alice's true form. Her family is absolutely horrified at the sight of Alice. The story ends with Professor Dayton, the mad scientist from down the street, using another remote control to turn Alice into a white rabbit. Notable in this story is the link to Lewis Carroll's Alice's Adventures in Wonderland. Victor, the vampire, makes an appearance in this story.

The Radio
Jerry is a part-time security guard who buys a radio from a homeless street vendor to replace his old one which has stopped working; however, this mysterious new radio is far from ordinary as it can have a conversation with Jerry. Very soon, Jerry is stealing money and murdering people, all at the whim of his new radio.

After escaping with a hooker who lives in his building, Jerry is told by the radio to kill the hooker or she will kill him. He refuses and destroys the radio. Right after, the hooker finds his gun in the car and shoots Jerry, killing him. Moments after she kills him and wipes the gun clean, she is shot in the head. The shooter is revealed to be the pimp living in the same building as Jerry. When the pimp returns to his car, another radio tells him to go and start a new life.

Alice's father Detective Jacobs also appears in this story, investigating the various murders and strange goings-on taking place. The killer call girl, Rachel, also makes an appearance in this story, as well as the pimp and the two boys from "The Professor's Wife".

Call Girl
Rachel, a murderous call girl, receives a request from a shy man named Victor, her newest client. Rachel thinks he will be just another easy victim. When Rachel gets there, scenes of a murdered family with their necks ripped out are flashed on-screen, and there is no evidence of Victor living in the house.

Rachel then chains him to the bed and proceeds to stab him in the chest, places a pillow over his face, and then has a quick shower. She then keeps hearing Victor's voice saying, "You killed me." Rachel removes the pillow and reveals a gruesome creature with a large, toothy mouth. It is then revealed that Victor is an actual vampire. He kills Rachel and hangs her in the room with the house owners whom he's already killed. Blood starts pouring down her neck in a strange way indicating she will become a vampire. The two young men from The Professor's Wife and the pimp from The Radio appear in this segment.

The Professor's Wife
Two former students come to visit Professor Dayton and meet his fiancée Kathy. Having been victims of his practical jokes in the past, they suspect that Kathy is actually a robot, which the professor has supposedly spent the last 20 years working on in his laboratory. She also behaves like a robot and does not eat or drink, which further indicates that she is probably mechanical.

When the professor is out of the house, they decide to dismantle Kathy to see what she looks like on the inside. To their utter horror, they learn that Kathy really was a human being after all and that she was a mail-order bride. The professor later buys an 'advanced' voodoo kit from the homeless street vendor to put Kathy back together in time for the wedding.

Rachel, the killer call girl, makes a brief appearance in this story.

Haunted Dog
A cruel, miserly doctor, Dr. Farwell, is working a 30-day court-ordered sentence at a free clinic, where he is very insolent and rude towards his patients. He even goes as far as to show no sympathy towards a young girl with a brain tumor and mocks an elderly woman who is going blind. One day, he buys a hot dog.

Dr. Farwell accidentally drops it on the ground. He sadistically decides to give the dirty hot dog to a homeless man who has been bothering him for some spare change. The homeless man dies after taking one bite, and he returns to haunt the cruel doctor. The story ends with the doctor having a heart attack from having had too many encounters with his ghostly stalker. Victor from "Call Girl" also appears in this segment, and he seems to be in cahoots with Dr. Farwell. The homeless man can be heard muttering, "Thanks for the good dog" to Dr. Farwell throughout the segment, an allusion to Creepshow 2s "The Hitch-Hiker". The Hispanic woman from "Alice" also makes an appearance in this story.

Epilogue
It is revealed that the street vendor/homeless man got the two radios from Professor Dayton in "The Professor's Wife". After this tale ends, it then shows Professor Dayton at his wedding with his resurrected wife (who is bandaged up from being murdered in "The Professor's Wife") with a huge crowd around them. It shows Professor Dayton and his wife driving off. Alice's mom states that Alice will look so beautiful on her wedding day to which her family agrees as Alice's rabbit form is in the back seat of Professor Dayton's car. The priest asks the husband how Carol is with the response that she's not well at all and still believes that she has a daughter named Alice. It then zooms in on the back of the hot dog guy's head. He turns around, revealing that he was the Creep (resembling the version from Creepshow 2) all along.

Cast

"Alice"
 Stephanie Pettee as Alice
 Simon Burzynski as Harry the Postman
 Rami Rank as Neighbor
 Derek Schachter as Neighbor's Kid
 Snowball as Alice (Rabbit Form)

Alice family #1
 Roy Abramsohn as Alice's father/ Detective Jacobs
 Susan Schramm as Alice's mother Susan Schramm imdb
 Bunny Gibson as Alice's grandmother/ Dean Thompson
 Matt Fromm as Jesse

Alice family #2
 Nathan Kirkland as Alice's father
 Selma Pinkard as Alice's mother
 Kalena Knox as Alice's grandmother
 Brian Jacobs as Jesse

Alice family #3
 Leonardo Millan as Alice's father
 Magi Avila as Nurse Jacobs/ Alice's mother
 Margarita Lugo as Alice's grandmother
 Robert Gonzalez as Jesse

"The Radio"
 A. J. Bowen as Jerry
 Elina Madison as Eva
 Akil Wingate as Leon
 Cara Cameron as The Radio
 Elwood Carlisle as Legless the Homeless Man
 Justin Smith as Ronald
 Karen Agnes as Sherry the Hooker
 James Dudelson as TV-operator
 Scott Dudelson as Passed-out Junkie

 

"Call Girl"
 Camille Lacey as Rachel
 Ryan Carty as Victor
 Moya Nkruma as Street Girl
 Eileen Dietz as Claire the Homeless Woman 
 Pablo Pappano as Fat Joe
 Frank Pappano as Father
 Margaret Pappano as Mother

"The Professor's Wife"
 Emmet McGuire as Professor Dayton
 Bo Kresic as Kathy
 Michael Madrid as Charles
 Ben Pronsky as John
 Joseph Russo as Father Russo

"Haunted Dog"
 Kris Allen as Dr. Farewell
 Ed Dyer as Cliffie
 Leigh Rose as Mrs. Lensington
 Dean Dinning as Stephan Rhodes
 Katherine Barber as Dusty Rhodes 
 John C. Larkin as Security Guard
 Mike Dalager as Dr. McKinney
 April Wade as Nurse
 Greg McDougall as Hot Dog Man/Creep
 Andre Dupont as Ambulance Attendant-1
 Christopher Estes as Ambulance Attendant-2
 Dean Battaglia as Dino

Production

Creepshow 3 was backed by the Taurus Entertainment Company and directed by James Glenn Dudelson and Ana Clavell. The film's special make-up effects were created by Greg McDougall, who has also worked on Steven Spielberg's War of the Worlds in the special effects department.

Release
The film was released on April 24, 2006, in Bristol, Rhode Island, in the United States by HBO through their parent company Warner Home Video. The film was released in the United Kingdom on October 20, 2008, by Anchor Bay UK.

Reception
On review aggregation website Rotten Tomatoes the film has an approval rating of 0% based on 6 reviews, with an average rating of 2.7/10.

Steve Barton at Dread Central called it an "in name only" sequel and that it was "void of any character, depth, integrity, scares, or feeling." James Butane, also of Dread Central, rated it 2/5 and said "This is not a movie worthy to be called Creepshow for any reason, believe me." Rob Hunter of /Film panned the film as "bad" and said "the film never feels like a Creepshow film."

References

External links

2006 horror films
2000s comedy horror films
2000s monster movies
American comedy horror films
American horror anthology films
American monster movies
American sequel films
Direct-to-video sequel films
Direct-to-video horror films
American vampire films
Parodies of horror
2000s English-language films
2000s American films